A "ride-or-die chick" is a neologism of biker culture origin referring to a "woman willing to support her partner and his risky lifestyle despite how this might endanger or harm her." The woman may even take an active role as an accomplice and manifests a "willingness to help men in dangerous situations" and "a sense of shared risk."

Origin
The term "ride or die" initially had a different meaning. It comes from 1950s biker slang; The phrase originally meaning that if a biker couldn't ride, then he'd rather die. This has changed over the years, however, the new meaning relates to relationships between people. The term refers to a woman who embraces the "us-against-the-world", Bonnie and Clyde dynamic with her boyfriend or husband. In theory, she accepts a life being his partner in crime, willing to do anything even if doing so results in danger towards her.

Use in hip-hop music

The "ride-or-die chick" trope is used by both men and women in hip hop music with men stating their desire or love of ride-or-die chicks, and women identifying themselves as willing to ride or die.  Many of these songs are duets between male and female artists and contain both of these perspectives within the same song.

The song to popularize the "Ride or Die" outlook on life was "Ride or Die" by Baby Gangsta featuring Lil Wayne and Juvenile. The song, released in 1997, was on Baby Gangsta's third studio album, It's All on U, Vol. 2.  It was produced by Mannie Fresh.

Jay-Z and the Ruff Ryders advanced the term into the mainstream, in 1998 and 1999 respectively, with the songs "Ride or Die" on Vol. 2... Hard Knock Life and "Ryde or Die" on Ryde or Die Vol. 1.

However, the first mainstream rap song to advance the notion of the lifestyle of a woman willing to "ride or die" was "The Bonnie and Clyde Theme" by Yo Yo in a duet featuring Ice Cube, on her third studio album You Better Ask Somebody, released in June 1993.  The popularization of the term "ride-or-die chick" did not enter mainstream hip-hop until The Lox released a duet with Eve, "Ryde or Die, Bitch," on the 2000 album We Are the Streets.  The song was produced by Timbaland.

Other examples of the term in hip hop include:

"'03 Bonnie and Clyde" by Jay-Z ft. Beyonce
"Hail Mary," Tupac Shakur (as Makaveli)
"Dog Match" by Eve ft. DMX
U Make Me Wanna by Jadakiss ft. Mariah Carey
"Down Ass Bitch" by Ja Rule ft. Charli Baltimore
"You're All I Need" by Method Man ft. Mary J. Blige
"I killed Darnell Simmons" by Gun Rack aka Jordan Peele
"Boss Bitch" by Mac ft. Mia X
"Ryda" by The Game ft. Dej Loaf
"Bottom Bitch" by Rafael Casal
"Rider" by Future (feat. Tasha Catour)
"#HoodLove" by Jazmine Sullivan
"R.O.D." by G-Dragon (feat. Lydia Paek)
 "Him & I" by G-Eazy and Halsey
 "Rider Chick" by Lil Durk ft Dej Loaf 
"Ride or Die" by Nova (feat. Nia Kay)
"She’s not me (Ride or Die)" and "Blue Jeans" by Lana Del Rey
"We Ride" by Gucci Mane (feat. Monica)
"Ride or Die" by Fetty Wap (feat. Jhonni Blaze)
"I Do" by Young Jeezy feat. Jay-Z and André 3000
"R.O.D." by A Boogie wit da Hoodie
"Ride For You" by Meek Mill (feat. Kehlani)
"Ride Or Die" by Megan Thee Stallion & VickeeLo
 "I Need That" by the Peach Tree Rascals

Use in hip hop discourse

Within celebrity culture
This term is sometimes used to describe the lives and decisions of women in the hip hop community. In their interview with Tashera Simmons following the announcement that she was divorcing DMX, Essence magazine referred to her as "having a reputation for being the ultimate ride or die chick," citing Simmons' support of DMX despite his jail time, drug use, and infidelity. Lil' Kim was also called a ride-or-die chick after she went to jail for perjury for lying to a jury about her manager regarding a shootout involving several rappers.

The term does not always imply drama and danger. For example, Gabrielle Union was described as a ride-or-die chick for her public and vehement defense of her husband Dwyane Wade after his talent was criticized by basketball player/analyst Charles Barkley. "Ride or die" is sometimes used a shorthand for any heterosexual commitment in the hip hop community, such as in the Philadelphia Tribunes statement that Beyonce and Jay-Z were "ride and die" after they renewed their wedding vows.

Outside of celebrity culture
The term is frequently used negatively outside of celebrity culture. Blogs targeting young Black members of the "hip hop generation" as their demographic, such as Hello Beautiful, Hall of the Black Dragon, and Urbanbellemag.com, have all published articles that advise women to be wary of attempting to be a ride-or-die chick at the expense of their own happiness and health. These articles argue women need specific boundaries in their romantic relationships and dismiss the idea of limitless loyalty as either unrealistic myth or facilitating abuse and disrespect. However, this negative perspective is not universal. The website https://www.singleblackmale.org, which claims to represent the "urban male perspective", tells women specific ways they can achieve ride-or-die status that vary from "being down for the cause" to "either watch sports...or get out and leave (your man) alone."

Academic response

Defense of term
Black feminist scholar Treva Lindsey claims the ride-or-die chick is a challenge to a dominant narrative in hip hop that privileges homosocial male relationships and undermines heterosexual romantic bonds between men and women. Drawing on scholars Patricia Hill Collins and bell hooks, she argues this love is not only personal, it is also an act of political rebellion because "In a culture that claims black women are unlovable and undesirable, and black men are violent and irredeemable, it is considered 'rebellious' when black men and women love each other." Others have also argued that the "ride or die" narrative is a recognition of the disenfranchisement these couples face because of race and class and it is because of this systematic oppression that they feel it is them against the world. In this understanding by claiming to be a ride-or-die chick, a woman is not diminishing her own self-worth or inviting mistreatment, but symbolically invoking a politically aware alliance. Her recognition that committing to this relationship will require her to "ride or die" is a statement about the difficulty her partner will likely face as a Black man living an illicit lifestyle.

Another favorable understanding of the trope argues its meaning is flexible and can positively evolve. For example, one definition of this term claimed "for a 30+ year old man, who has his ish together, a down ass chick is someone who is down for you in other ways...Both versions are loyal and have your back but... the 30+ DAC is not willing (nor required) to sacrifice herself or her goals for her man. They are building together."

Critique of term
Despite these positive readings and the fact that ride-or-die chicks are often the subject of male praise or female self-identification in hip hop, they have also been critiqued as a negative and damaging ideal imposed on Black women. Critics have argued that ride-or-die chicks are a heterosexual male fantasy that privileges male pleasure and ignores the costs women must pay to fulfill this fantasy. Hip hop feminist author Gwendolyn D. Pough claims the rising number of Black women in prison, currently the fastest-growing prison population, is evidence of the high cost ride-or-die chicks must pay.

The ride-or-die chick can also be understood as a hip hop reiteration of the Madonna–whore complex. In this understanding the ride-or-die chick is the Madonna and her opposite is the trick/hoe. Unlike the "Madonna", the ride-or-die chick is sexualized (casting doubt on this very comparison), but unlike the trick/ho, her sexuality is praised and valued. The ride-or-die chick is not seen as sexually deviant because her partner is the only man with access to her body. Like the Madonna–whore paradigm, in this schema women's sexuality is only for male pleasure and is limited to fulfilling one of two restrictive opposing roles. Also like the Madonna–whore, in this understanding the ride-or-die chick is a sexual script although, unlike Madonna–whore it is specific to Black women. In an interview, hip hop activist Toni Blackman noted that it is not the sexuality of these scripts she is troubled by, but that "woman's choices are only limited to A, B and C. When a guy gets to choose between ABCDEFGHIJKLMNOP." In this critique the problem with the ride-or-die chick is not its specific meaning but its place as one of several stereotypes, or scripts, that supposedly represent the entirety of Black female behavior.

See also
Stereotypes of African Americans
Mami (hip hop)
Video vixen

References

Hip hop phrases
Stereotypes of African Americans
Stereotypes of women
Women in hip hop music
Motorcycling subculture